Mil y Una Historias En Vivo is a 2006 album by Franco De Vita. The album earned a Latin Grammy Award nomination for Best Male Pop Vocal Album.

Track listing

"Tengo" (studio) Pop Version 
"Ay Dios" (studio) con Diego “El Cigala”
"Te Veo Venir Soledad" (studio) con Alejandro Fernández
"Tengo" (studio, tropical version)
"Intro"
"Latino"
"Calido y Frio"
"Tu De Que Vas"
"Fuera de este Mundo"
"Somos Tres"
"Te Amo"
"Si La Ves" con Reyli y Jeremías
"Si Tu No Estas"
"Popurrí: Aqui Estas Otra Vez / Ya Lo He Vivido / Si Quieres Decir Adios / Y Te Pienso / Solo Importas Tu / Te Recordare
"Louis"
"No Basta"
"No Hay Cielo"
"Un Buen Perdedor"

Sales and certifications

References

2006 albums
2006 live albums
Franco De Vita live albums
Sony Music live albums
Spanish-language live albums